Lewis Ronald McNeir (born December 14, 1951) is an American singer and songwriter.

Biography
McNeir was born in Camden, Alabama. As a solo artist, he recorded for the De-to, RCA, Prodigal, Motown, Capitol, Expansion and Motor City labels, recording his first song when he was seventeen. His friendship with Kim Weston, for whom he was musical director, led to his recording for RCA, then for moonlighting Motown Vice-President Barney Ales, the owner of the Prodigal label. When Ales went back to Motown, McNeir became a Motown artist, recording the 1976 album "Love's Comin' Down". He would later duet with Teena Marie on the song "We've Got To Stop Meeting Like This" from her 1984 Epic album, Starchild and serve as the musical director for The Four Tops for several years. He became an official member of the Tops in 1999 when lead singer Levi Stubbs was too ill to continue singing with the group.
He has been with the group ever since. He also was nominated for a Grammy Award in the Gospel Music category in 1981 for his collaboration with Rance Allen and in 2007, he released Ronnie Mac & Company, which featured collaborations with Kirk Whalum, Kathy Lamar and fellow Four Top Theo Peoples. Throughout his career, Ronnie has also worked with Bobby Womack, David Ruffin, Smokey Robinson, Angela Winbush, the Whispers, Carrie Lucas and Eddie Kendricks.

Discography

Studio albums
Ronnie McNeir (Ronnie McNeir album)|Ronnie McNeir (LP) RCA Victor (1972) / (LP, Album, RE) RCA (1976) / (CD, Album, RE) Dusty Groove America (2008)
Ronnie McNeir (LP)  Prodigal  (1975)
Love's Comin' Down (LP) Motown  (1976)
The Ronnie McNeir Experience (LP) Capitol Records  (1984)
Love Suspect (LP) Setting Sun (1985)
Life & Love (CD, Album) Expansion  (1989)
The Best Of Ronnie McNeir (CD, Comp)  Motorcity Records, Hot Productions  (1996)
Rare McNeir (CD, Comp)  About Time Records (2)  (1996)
Down In The Neighborhood (CD, Album)  Expansion  (1997)
The Best Of (CD, Album)  Expansion  (2002)
Ronnie Mac & Company (CD)  Jupiter Island Productions  (2007)
I'm Dedicating My Love (CD, Album)  Motorcity OMP  (2007)
Living My Life (CD, Album)  Sunset Island Records  (2011)

References

External links

 http://www.thefourtops.org/members/ronnie_mcneir.html
 http://www.ronniemcneir.com
 http://www.soulwalking.co.uk/Ronnie%20McNeir.html
 http://www.soulexpress.net/deep3_2011.htm#ronniemcneir
Ronnie McNeir 2012 Interview at Soulinterviews.com.

1949 births
Living people
Songwriters from Alabama
American male singers
Four Tops members
People from Camden, Alabama
American male songwriters